Leski may refer to:

People 
 Andreja Leški (born 1997), Slovenian judoka
 Janusz Łęski (born 1930), Polish film director and screenwriter
 Kazimierz Leski (1912–2000), Polish engineer and spy

Places 
 Leski, Vinica, North Macedonia
 Lesko County, Subcarpathian Voivodeship, Poland